Grouper is the solo project of American musician, artist and producer Liz Harris (born July 15, 1980). She has released material on her own label and other independent labels since 2005. Grouper released the critically acclaimed Dragging a Dead Deer Up a Hill in 2008, followed by five more records, including a two-part album, A I A, and the piano-led album Ruins. Her twelfth album, Shade, was released in 2021.

Grouper has collaborated with a number of other artists, including Xiu Xiu, Tiny Vipers (as the duo Mirrorring), Roy Montgomery, The Bug, Lawrence English (as Slow Walkers), and Jefre Cantu-Ledesma (as Raum).

History
Harris was born July 15, 1980 in Northern California and grew up around the San Francisco Bay area.
She grew up in a Fourth Way commune there which was inspired by the philosophy of George Gurdjieff. The community was known as "The Group", which would later serve as some inspiration for the moniker Grouper. According to Harris, the kids called each other and the parents 'groupers' sort of as a defiance. She says: "It was us making our own identities inside a pretty controlled environment, and sort of lashing back maybe... When I had to think of a name I felt annoyed at nothing sounding right. I wanted something that referenced me without referencing 'Me.'" According to her, she "felt like the music was at its barest just a grouping of sounds, and I was just the grouper."

After finishing college, Harris briefly moved to Los Angeles, where she worked with Mayo Thompson at Patrick Painter. Harris is now based in Oregon. Harris’ first album was 2005’s Grouper, a self-released full-length CD-R, followed later that year by Way Their Crept on Free Porcupine (re-released in 2007 on Type Records). In 2006 she released a single (He Knows), one album, called Wide, and a collaboration with Xiu Xiu entitled Creepshow. Harris made available new material steadily through the years, and continued to collaborate with various artists such as Roy Montgomery and Xela.

In 2008 she released Dragging a Dead Deer Up a Hill, her breakthrough album. An AllMusic reviewer Heather Phares praised the album for showing more musical range than Harris' previous work and for "letting more melody, more structured songs, and even a few phrases emerge from the ether." Pitchfork gave it 8.2 stars calling the work "an arresting album of pastoral psychedelic pop".

In 2011, Grouper released an album consisting of two parts: A I A: Dream Loss and A I A: Alien Observer, which was critically acclaimed by Pitchfork, while the latter part was noted for being more accessible of the two discs.

Early in 2012, Grouper performed Violet Replacement in the UK and Europe, a pair of longform tape collage pieces which originally took shape for commissioned performances in New York and Berkeley. She also collaborated with Jesy Fortino of Tiny Vipers to release an album Foreign Body under their common moniker Mirrorring.

At Berlin's Club Transmediale festival in early February 2012 Harris performed Circular Veil in collaboration with Jefre Cantu-Ledesma. Somewhere between an installation and a performance, it found her extending her more concise music outward into eight hours of music, designed to mimic one full sleep cycle.

In 2013, Harris released an album, The Man Who Died in His Boat. 

Grouper's studio album titled Ruins was released on October 31, 2014.  The album is relatively stripped-down; piano, voice and field recordings. The majority of the album was recorded in Aljezur, Portugal in 2011, while Harris was on a residency set up by Galeria Zé dos Bois. That same year she appeared on The Bug's album providing vocals for the track "Void".

In 2015, Grouper collaborated with an independent filmmaker Paul Clipson on the film Hypnosis Display, commissioned by Leeds Opera North.

In 2016, Grouper released a 7" entitled  'Paradise Valley'.

In 2017, Grouper was one of the curators for the 11th edition of the Dutch Le Guess Who? festival. Her curated program included films La Double Vie de Véronique by Krzysztof Kieślowski and Lighthouse by Paul Clipson and music performances from artists Marisa Anderson, William Basinski, Marcia Bassett & Samara Lubelski duo, Brötzmann/Leigh, Ekin Fil, Keiji Haino, Roy Montgomery, Coby Sey, Tiny Vipers, Wolfgang Voigt and Richard Youngs.

On March 8, 2018, Grouper announced a new album Grid of Points and released the first single "Parking Lot" from the album. The album was released on April 27 via Kranky.

On July 27, 2021, Harris announced a new Grouper album, Shade, and released its first single "Unclean Mind". The album was released on October 22 via Kranky. It features songs that were recorded over the past fifteen years.

Musical style
The style of Grouper is sparse ambient music, making use of acoustic guitar, piano and housed vocal loops. Writing for the Chicago Tribune, Andy Downing noted a primitive and collage approach to how Harris constructs soundscapes.   

During her days as a part of a Fourth Way commune, Harris' primary sources for discovering music were limited. With a little help from her parents, whose musical tastes were eclectic and divergent, she discovered Eastern European folk and American avant-pop. Through her father, who himself was a composer, she would later discover contemporary classical and early music. In 2008, when she released Dragging a Dead Deer Up a Hill, Pitchfork compared it to classic ethereal releases from the British label 4AD, drawing comparisons to Cocteau Twins and early His Name Is Alive. The Portland Mercury described some songs from the album, such as "Wind and Snow" and "Stuck", sonically reminiscent of the Renaissance period composers Gesualdo and Monteverdi.

Discography
AlbumsWay Their Crept (2005)Grouper (2005)Wide (2006)Cover the Windows and the Walls (2007)Dragging a Dead Deer Up a Hill (2008)A I A: Dream Loss (2011)A I A: Alien Observer (2011)The Man Who Died in His Boat (2013)Ruins (2014)Grid of Points (2018)After its Own Death / Walking in a Spiral Towards The House as "Nivhek" (2019) Shade (2021)

EPs and SinglesHe Knows (2006)Tried (2007)Hold/Sick (2010)Water People (2011)Violet Replacement| Pt. I: Rolling Gate (2012)Violet Replacement| Pt. II: Sleep (2012)Paradise Valley (2016)Children (2017)

CollaborationsCreepshow as "Xiu Xiu vs. Grouper" (2006)Eckords. with Jorge Behringer as "Flash Lights" (2006)Visitor with Ilyas Ahmed (2011)Foreign Body with Tiny Vipers as "Mirrorring" (2012)Slow Walkers with Lawrence English as "Slow Walkers" (2013)The Event of Your Leaving with Jefre Cantu-Ledesma as "Raum" (2013)Felt This Way/Dying All The Time with Jed Bindeman and Scott Simmons as "Helen" (2014)Void and Black Wasp with The Bug (2014)Daughter with Jefre Cantu-Ledesma as "Raum" (2022)

Split ReleasesSplit with Pumice (2009)Grouper/City Center with City Center (2009)Tsuki No Seika Volume One with Xela (2009)Roy Montgomery/Grouper - featuring Grouper's Vessel EP - with Roy Montgomery (2010)

Notes

References

Further reading
 Segal, Dave (April 16, 2009). "Through the Pastoral, Darkly". The Stranger.
 Bevan, David (October 15, 2008). "Grouper: Hymns from a Nor-Cal Loner". XLR8R.
 Stosuy, Brandon. (May 29, 2018). "On finding common experiences that are otherwise impossible". The Creative Independent.
 "Questions of Doom with Liz Harris of Grouper". Bad Vibes''.

External links
 Official website
 Grouper BandCamp website
 Liz Harris' visual art website

1980 births
Living people
Singers from Oregon
Singers from California
American women in electronic music
Guitarists from Oregon
21st-century American singers
21st-century American women singers
Guitarists from California
21st-century American guitarists
21st-century American women guitarists